The Barnhart Twin 15 "Wampus-Kat" is a twin engine biplane that was built in 1920.

Design and development
The prototype was built in Pasadena, California in 1920 by G.E. Barnhart, an engineer for the Handley Page program.

The "Wampus-Kat" was a twin engine conventional landing gear-equipped biplane with folding wings. There are ailerons on both upper and lower wings. The wooden fuselage had a small nose-mounted door that allowed access for four passengers inside and one pilot in an open cockpit above. All surfaces are fabric covered except the cabin. The main fuel tank was below the fuselage with a small gravity feeder tank.

Operational history
The Wampus-Kat was christened with a spray of roses in Pasadena in August 1921. Four passengers flew in a flight demonstration. It was wrecked in a windstorm at the (Altadena golf course) Makepeace Airport in California. Financing for a rebuild was not obtained, and further development stopped.

Specifications (Barnhart Twin "Wampus-Kat")

See also

References

Twin 15
1920s United States experimental aircraft
Biplanes
Twin piston-engined tractor aircraft
Aircraft first flown in 1921